Dinamo București was an ice hockey team in Bucharest, Romania. They participated in the Romanian Hockey League, the top level Romanian ice hockey league.

The club was founded in 1948 as a member of the CS Dinamo București sports club. The team was dissolved in 2005 due to lack of funds.

Honours
Romanian Hockey League champion (7) :
 1968, 1971, 1972, 1973, 1976, 1979, 1981
Vice-champion (9) :
 1967, 1969, 1970, 1974, 1975, 1978, 1980, 1982, 1988.

Notable former players
Eduard Pană
Doru Tureanu

References

Ice hockey teams in Romania
Ice hockey